Bradycellus festinans is a species of ground beetle in the family Carabidae. It is found in North America. The bug is attracted to light using it (the Moon) to navigate. Their average size is around 5 millimeter.

References

Further reading

 

Harpalinae
Articles created by Qbugbot
Beetles described in 1914